Dick Hollander (born 28 January 1941) is a Dutch footballer. He played in one match for the Netherlands national football team in 1964.

References

External links
 

1941 births
Living people
Dutch footballers
Netherlands international footballers
Place of birth missing (living people)
Association footballers not categorized by position